Jack Kirby was a prolific comics creator who created many American comic books and characters, particularly for Marvel Comics and DC Comics.

Comics
Sources:

Comics work (interior pencil art and story) includes:

DC Comics

 Adventure Comics (Sandman) #72–97, 100–102 (1942–46); (Manhunter): #73–80 (1942–43); (Green Arrow) #250–256 (1957)
 All Star Comics #14–17, 19 (Sandman) (1942–43)
 All-Star Western #99 (1958)
 The Amazing World of DC Comics #1 (1974) (material intended for In the Days of the Mob #2)
The Best of DC #22 (story intended for unpublished Sandman #7) (1981)
 Boy Commandos #1–6, 15, 17, 19, 21, 23–24, 29–33 (1942–43; 1946–49) 
 Cancelled Comic Cavalcade (Sandman) #2 (1978)
 Challengers of the Unknown #1–8 (1958–59)
 DC Comics Presents #84 (Superman and the Challengers of the Unknown) (1985)
 DC Graphic Novel #4 ("The Hunger Dogs") (1985)
 Demon #1–16 (1972–74)
 Detective Comics (Boy Commandos) #64–83, 85, 128, 134, 136–137, 150 (1942–44, 1947–48)
 1st Issue Special #1 (Atlas), #5 (Manhunter), #6 (Dingbats of Danger Street) (1975)
 Forbidden Tales of Dark Mansion #6 (1972) (material intended for Spirit World #2)
 Forever People #1–11 (1971–72)
 Heroes Against Hunger #1 (two pages only) (1986)
 House of Mystery #61, 63, 65–66, 70, 72, 76, 78–79, 84–85 (1957–59)
 House of Secrets #3–4, 8, 11–12 (1957–58)
 In the Days of the Mob #1 (1971)
 Justice, Inc. #2–4 (1975)
 Kamandi: The Last Boy on Earth #1–40 (1972–76)
 Kobra #1 (1976)
 Mister Miracle #1–18 (1971–74)
 My Greatest Adventure #15–18, 20–21, 28 (1957–59)
 New Gods #1–11 (1971–72)
 New Gods vol. 2 #6 (1984)
 O.M.A.C. #1–8 (1974–75)
 Our Fighting Forces (The Losers) #151–162 (1974–75)
 Real Fact Comics #1–2, 9 (1946–47)
 Richard Dragon, Kung Fu Fighter #3 (1975)
 Sandman #1, 4–6 (1974–76)
 Showcase (Challengers of the Unknown) #6-7, 11-12 (1957-1958)
 Spirit World #1 (1971)
 Star Spangled Comics (Newsboy Legion) #7–30, 53–56, 58–59 (1942–46)
 Superman #400 (1984)
 Superman's Pal Jimmy Olsen #133–139, 141–148 (1970–72)
 Super Powers #1–4 (plotter), #5 (writer/penciller) (1984)
 Super Powers vol. 2 #1–6 (1985–86)
 Tales of the Unexpected #12–13. 15–18, 21–24 (1957–58)
 Weird Mystery Tales #1–3 (1972) (material intended for Spirit World #2)
 Who's Who: The Definitive Directory of the DC Universe #2–6, 8–18, 20, 22 (1985–86)
 World's Finest Comics (Sandman) #6–7 (1942); (Boy Commandos) #8–11,13,14 (1942–43); (Green Arrow) #96–99  (1957)

Marvel Comics

 All Winners Comics #1–2 (Timely, 1941)
 Amazing Adventures #1–6 (1961)
 Amazing Adventures vol. 2 #1–4 (Inhumans) (1970–71)
 The Amazing Spider-Man #8 (1964)
 Astonishing #56 (Atlas, 1956)
 Astonishing Tales #1–2 (Ka-Zar) (1970)
 The Avengers #1–8 (full pencils), #14–16 (layouts only, pencils by Don Heck, Dick Ayers) (1963–65)
 Battle #64-70 (1959-1960)
 Battleground #14 (Atlas, 1956)
 Black Panther #1–12 (1977–78)
 Black Rider #1 (Atlas, 1957)
 Captain America Comics #1–10 (Timely, 1941–42)
 Captain America #100–109, 112 (1968–69); #193–214, Annual #3–4 (1976–77)
 Chamber of Darkness #4–5 (1970)
 Daring Mystery Comics #6 (Timely, 1940)
 Devil Dinosaur #1–9 (1978)
 Eternals #1–19, Annual #1 (1976–78)
 Fantastic Four #1–102, 108, 236, Annual #1–6 (1961–71, 1981)
 Gunsmoke Western #47, 51, 59, 62-67, 69-71, 73, 77 (1958-1963)
 The Incredible Hulk #1–5 (1962–63)
 Journey into Mystery #51–52, 54–82 (1959–62); (Thor): #83–89, 93, 97–125, Annual #1 (1962–66)
 Kid Colt Outlaw #86, 93, 95-96 (1959-1961); #119 (1964)
 Love Romances #85, #96-105 (1960-1963)
 Machine Man #1–9 (1978)
 Marvel Mystery Comics #13–25 (Golden Age Vision)(Timely, 1940–41)
 Marvel Treasury Special Featuring Captain America's Bicentennial Battles (1976)
 My Own Romance #74 (1960)
 Not Brand Echh #1, 3, 5–7 (1967–68)
 Quick Trigger Western #16 (Atlas, 1957)
 Rawhide Kid #17-32, 34, 43 (1960-1964)
 Red Raven Comics #1 (Timely, 1940)
 Sgt. Fury and his Howling Commandos #1–7, 13 (1963–64) 
 Silver Surfer #18 (1970)
 Silver Surfer: The Ultimate Cosmic Experience (1978) (Marvel Fireside Books/Simon & Schuster)
 Strange Stories of the Unusual #7 (Atlas, 1956)
 Strange Tales #67–70, 72–100 (1959–62); (Human Torch): #101–105, 108–109, 114, 120, Annual #2 (1962–64); (Nick Fury): #135, 141–142 (full pencils), 136–140, 143–153 (layouts only, pencils by John Severin, Jim Steranko and others) (1965–67)
 Strange Worlds #1, 3 (1958-1959)
 Tales of Suspense #2–4, 7–35 (1959–62); (Iron Man): #40-41, 43 (1963); (Captain America): #59–68, 78–86, 92–99 (full pencils), #69–75, 77 (layouts only) (1964–1968) 
 Tales to Astonish #1, 5–34; (Ant-Man): #35–40, 44, 49–51 (1962–64); (The Incredible Hulk): #68–72 (full pencils), #73–84 (layouts only, pencils by Bill Everett and others) (1965–66)
 Teen-Age Romance #84-86 (1961-1962)
 Thor #126–177, 179, Annual #2 (1966–70)
 Two-Gun Kid #54-55, 57-62 (1960-1963)
 Two Gun Western #12 (Atlas, 1957)
 2001: A Space Odyssey #1–10 (1976–77)
 2001: A Space Odyssey treasury special (1976)
 What If #11 (Fantastic Four) (1978)
 World of Fantasy #16, 18 (1959)
 X-Men #1–11 (full pencils), #12–17 (layouts only, pencils by Alex Toth and Werner Roth) (1963–65)
 Yellow Claw #2-4 (Atlas, 1956-1957)
 Young Allies Comics #1 (Timely, 1941)

Crestwood Publications/Prize

All For Love vol. 3, #2 (1959)
Black Magic #1-7, #10-11, #13, #15, #18-33 (1950-54)
Fighting American #1-7 (1954-55); #1 (1966, Harvey Comics)
Frankenstein Comics #7 (1947)
Headline Comics #23–37 (1947-49)
Justice Traps the Guilty #1-10, #18-19 (1947-49, 1950)
Prize Comics #7-9, #63 (1940–41, 1947)
Real West Romances #4-5 (1949-50)
Strange World of Your Dreams #1-3 (1952)
Treasure Comics #10 (1946)
Western Love #1-2, 5 (1949–50)
Young Brides #1-4, #6-12, #25-30 (1952-54, 1955-56)
Young Love #1-4, #6-10, #13-23, #25, #30-31, #36-37, #39-51, #55, #69-73 (1949-54, 1956)
Young Romance #1–47, #53-67, #80-88, #90-93, #95, #97-99, #102-103 (1947-54, 1955-59)

Other publishers

Argosy vol. 3 #2 (1990) (Richard Kyle Publications)
All-New Comics #13 (1946) (Harvey Comics)
Airboy Comics vol. 4 #5–11 (1947) (Hillman Comics)
Black Cat #6–8 (1947) (Harvey Comics)
Boy Explorers #1–2 (1946) (Harvey Comics)
Boys' Ranch #1–6 (1950–51) (Harvey Comics)
Blue Bolt Comics #2–6, 8–10 (1940–41) (Novelty Press)
Bullseye #1–5 (1954-1955) (Mainline Publications)
Captain 3-D #1 (1953) (Harvey Comics)
Captain Marvel Adventures #1 (1941) (Fawcett Comics)
Captain Victory and the Galactic Rangers #1–13, Special #1 (1981–84) (Pacific Comics)
Clue Comics #13, vol. 2 #1–3 (1947) (Hillman Comics)
Champion Comics #10 (1940) (Harvey Comics)
Crash Comics Adventures #1–3 (1940) (Holyoke Publishing)
Destroyer Duck #1–5 (with Steve Gerber) (1982–83) (Eclipse Comics)
Double Life of Private Strong #1–2 (1959) (Archie Comics)
Famous Funnies #63, 84 (1939) (Eastern Color)
Fly #1–2 (1959) (Archie Comics)
Foxhole #2 (1954) (Mainline Publications)
Green Hornet Fights Crime #37–39 (1947–58) (Harvey Comics)
In Love #1–3 (1954) (Mainline Publications)
Jumbo Comics #1–3 (1938) (Fiction House)
The Last of the Viking Heroes Summer Special #1 (writer, with David Schwartz and Michael Thibodeaux) (1987) (Genesis West)
My Date Comics #1-4 (1947-1948) (Hillman Comics)
Mystery Men Comics #10 (1940) (Fox Comics)
Phantom Force #1–2 (with Michael Thibodeaux) (1993–1994) (Image Comics)
Phantom Force #0 (with Michael Thibodeaux) (1994) (Genesis West)
Police Trap #2, 4 (1954–1955) (Mainline Publications)
Police Trap #5–6 (1955) (Charlton Comics)
Real Clue Crime Stories vol. 2 #4–6 (1947) (Hillman Comics)
Satan's Six #1 (1993) (Topps Comics)
Science Comics #4 (1940) (Fox Comics)
Silver Star #1–6 (1983–84) (Pacific Comics)
Stuntman #1–3 (1946) (Harvey Comics)
Turtle Soup #4 (with Michael Thibodeaux) (1992) (Mirage Studios)
Wow Comics #1 (1940–41) (Fawcett Comics)

Collected work

DC Comics
The Boy Commandos by Joe Simon and Jack Kirby Vol. 1 collects stories from Detective Comics #64–73; World's Finest Comics #8–9; and Boy Commandos #1–2; 256 pages, November 2010, 
The Boy Commandos by Joe Simon and Jack Kirby Vol. 2 collects stories from Detective Comics #74-85; World's Finest Comics #10-13; and Boy Commandos #3-5; 304 pages, December 2015, 
Challengers of the Unknown Archives
 Volume 1 collects Showcase #6–7, 11–12 and Challengers of the Unknown #1–2, 168 pages, August 2003, 
 Volume 2 collects Challengers of the Unknown #3–8, 168 pages, November 2004, 
Challengers of the Unknown by Jack Kirby collects Showcase #6–7, 11–12 and Challengers of the Unknown #1–8, 320 pages, June 2012, 
Fourth World by Jack Kirby Omnibus (New Printing) collects Superman’s Pal Jimmy Olsen #133-139 and 141-148, New Gods #1-11, Forever People #1-11, DC Graphic Novel #4: The Hunger Dogs and a story from New Gods #6 (1984). 1536 pages, September 2021, 
In the Days of the Mob collects In the Days of the Mob #1, 108 pages, August 2013, 
Jack Kirby's The Demon, collects The Demon #1–16, 384 pages, November 2008, 
Jack Kirby's The Forever People collects The Forever People #1–11, 288 pages, October 1999, 
Jack Kirby's Mister Miracle: Super Escape Artist collects Mr Miracle #1–10, 256 pages, September 1998, 
Jack Kirby's Fourth World: Featuring Mister Miracle collects Mr Miracle #11–18, 187 pages, July 2001, 
 Jack Kirby's Fourth World Omnibus
Volume 1 collects Forever People #1–3, Mister Miracle #1–3, The New Gods #1–3, Superman's Pal Jimmy Olsen #133–139, 396 pages, May 2007,  (hardcover); December 2011,  (paperback) 
Volume 2 collects Forever People #4–6, Mister Miracle #4–6, The New Gods #4–6, Superman's Pal Jimmy Olsen #141–145, 396 pages, August 2007,  (hardcover); April 2012,  (paperback)
Volume 3 collects Forever People #7–10, Mister Miracle #7–9, The New Gods #7–10, Superman's Pal Jimmy Olsen #146–148, 396 pages, November 2007,  (hardcover); August 2012,  (paperback)
Volume 4 collects Forever People #11; Mister Miracle #10–18; The New Gods #11; "Even Gods Must Die" from The New Gods vol. 2, #6; DC Graphic Novel #4: "The Hunger Dogs"; "On the Road to Armagetto!" (previously unpublished), 424 pages, March 2008,  (hardcover); December 2012,  (paperback)
Jack Kirby's New Gods, collects The New Gods #1–11; 304 pages, December 1997, 
Jack Kirby's O.M.A.C.: One Man Army Corps, collects O.M.A.C. #1–8, 200 pages, June 2008,  (hardcover); September 2013,  (paperback)
Jack Kirby Omnibus
 Volume 1 collects Green Arrow stories from Adventure Comics #250–256 and World's Finest Comics #96–99 plus stories from All-Star Western #99; House of Mystery #61, 63, 65–66, 70, 72, 76, 78–79, 84–85; House of Secrets #3–4, 8, 11–12; My Greatest Adventure #15–18, 20–21, 28; Real Fact Comics #1–2, 9; and Tales of the Unexpected #12–13. 15–18, 21–24; 304 pages, August 2011, 
 Volume 2 collects The Best of DC #22; Black Magic #1–9; DC Comics Presents #84; 1st Issue Special #1, 5–6; Kobra #1; Richard Dragon, Kung Fu Fighter #3; The Sandman #1, 4–6; Super Powers #1–5; and Super Powers vol. 2 #1–6; 624 pages, May 2013, 
Jimmy Olsen: Adventures by Jack Kirby
 Volume 1 collects Superman's Pal Jimmy Olsen #133–141, 183 pages, July 2003, 
 Volume 2 collects Superman's Pal Jimmy Olsen #142–150, 192 pages, October 2004, 
Kamandi Archives
 Volume 1 collects Kamandi: The Last Boy on Earth #1–10; 224 pages, October 2005, 
 Volume 2 collects Kamandi: The Last Boy on Earth #11–20; 228 pages, February 2007,  
 Kamandi by Jack Kirby 
 Volume 1 collects Kamandi: The Last Boy on Earth #1–20, 448 pages, September 2011, 
 Volume 2 collects Kamandi: The Last Boy on Earth #21–40, 424 pages, December 2012, 
The Losers by Jack Kirby collects Our Fighting Forces #151–162, 240 pages, March 2009, 
The Newsboy Legion by Joe Simon and Jack Kirby Volume 1 collects Star Spangled Comics #7–32, 360 pages, March 2010, 
Sandman by Joe Simon and Jack Kirby collects World's Finest Comics #6–7; Adventure Comics #72–102; and Sandman #1; 304 pages, August 2009, 
Showcase Presents Challengers of the Unknown Volume 1 collects Showcase #6–7, 11–12, and Challengers of the Unknown #1–17, 544 pages, September 2006, 
Showcase Presents Green Arrow Volume 1 collects Green Arrow stories from Adventure Comics #250–256 and World's Finest Comics #96–99; 528 pages, January 2006, 
 Spirit World collects work done for Spirit World #1 and 2, 108 pages, May 2012,

Marvel Comics
Marvel Masterworks: 
Avengers 
 Volume 1 collects The Avengers #1–8, 216 pages, September 1988, 
 Volume 2 collects The Avengers  #14–17, 224 pages, September 1989,  
Captain America 
 Volume 1 collects Tales of Suspense #59–68, 77–81, 272 pages, October 1990,  
 Volume 2 collects Tales of Suspense #82–86, 92–99 and Captain America #100, 240 pages, June 2005,  
 Volume 3 collects Captain America #101–109 and 112, 288 pages, July 2006,  
Fantastic Four
 Volume 1 collects Fantastic Four #1–10, 256 pages, November 1987,  
 Volume 2 collects Fantastic Four #11–20 and Fantastic Four Annual #1, 295 pages, October 1988,    
 Volume 3 collects Fantastic Four #21–30, 234 pages, September 1990,  
 Volume 4 collects Fantastic Four #31–40 and Fantastic Four Annual #2, 264 pages, November 1992,   
 Volume 5 collects Fantastic Four #41–50 and Fantastic Four Annual #3, 240 pages, October 1993,  
 Volume 6 collects Fantastic Four #51–60 and Fantastic Four Annual #4, 240 pages, October 2000,  
 Volume 7 collects Fantastic Four #61–71 and Fantastic Four Annual #5, 304 pages, August 2004,  
 Volume 8 collects Fantastic Four #72–81 and Fantastic Four Annual #6, 272 pages, March 2005,   
 Volume 9 collects Fantastic Four #82–93, 272 pages, November 2005,  
 Volume 10 collects Fantastic Four #94–102, 272 pages, May 2006,  
Golden Age Captain America
 Volume 1 collects #1–4, 264 pages, March 2005, 
 Volume 2 collects #5–8, 280 pages, July 2008, 
 Volume 3 collects #9–10, 280 pages, January 2009, 
Human Torch 
 Volume 1 collects Strange Tales #101–105, 108–109, 114 and Strange Tales Annual #2, 272 pages, September 2006,  
 Volume 2 collects Strange Tales #120, 256 pages, April 2009,  
The Incredible Hulk
 Volume 1 collects The Incredible Hulk #1–5, 150 pages, September 1989,   
 Volume 2 collects Tales to Astonish #68–79, 266 pages, December 2004,   
 Volume 3 collects Tales to Astonish #80–84, 288 pages, January 2006, 
Iron Man Volume 1 collects Tales of Suspense  #41 and 43, 197 pages, September 1992,   
Nick Fury, Agent of S.H.I.E.L.D. Volume 1 collects Strange Tales #135–153, 288 pages, September 2007,  
Sgt. Fury and his Howling Commandos Volume 1 collects Sgt. Fury and his Howling Commandos #1–7 and 13, 320 pages, February 2006, 
Tales of Suspense Volume 1 collects Tales of Suspense #2–4 and 7–10, 272 pages, October 2006,  
Tales to Astonish 
 Volume 1 collects Tales to Astonish #1 and 5–10, 272 pages, January 2006,   
 Volume 2 collects Tales to Astonish #11–20, 272 pages, March 2008,  
 Volume 3 collects Tales to Astonish #21–30, 272 pages, March 2010,  
 Volume 4 collects Tales to Astonish #31–34, 304 pages, January 2012,   
Thor 
 Volume 1 collects Journey Into Mystery #83–89, 93, 97–100, 280 pages, October 1991,  
 Volume 2 collects Journey Into Mystery #101–110, 224 pages, January 1994,  
 Volume 3 collects Journey Into Mystery #111–120 and Journey Into Mystery Annual #1, 256 pages, November 2001,  
 Volume 4 collects Journey Into Mystery #121–125 and Thor #126–130, 240 pages, November 2005,  
 Volume 5 collects Thor #131–140 and Thor Annual #2, 256 pages, November 2006,  
 Volume 6 collects Thor #141–151, 224 pages, July 2007,  
 Volume 7 collects Thor #152–162, 224 pages, May 2008,  
 Volume 8 collects Thor #163–172, 224 pages, February 2009,  
 Volume 9 collects Thor #173–177 and 179, 240 pages, October 2010,  
X-Men
 Volume 1 collects X-Men #1–10, 240 pages, November 1987,  
 Volume 2 collects X-Men #11–17, 240 pages, November 1988,  
Marvel Omnibus:
Captain America Volume 1 collects Tales of Suspense #59–99 and Captain America #100–109, 112, 856 pages, May 2011, 
Captain America by Jack Kirby collects Captain America #193–214, Captain America Annual #3–4; and Marvel Treasury Special Featuring Captain America's Bicentennial Battles, 568 pages, March 2011, 
The Eternals Omnibus collects The Eternals #1–19 and The Eternals Annual #1, 392 pages, July 2006,  
The Fantastic Four Omnibus 
 Volume 1 collects Fantastic Four #1–30 and Fantastic Four Annual #1, 848 pages, October 2013, 
 Volume 2 collects Fantastic Four #31–60 and Fantastic Four Annual #2–4, 832 pages, December 2013,  
The Incredible Hulk Omnibus Volume 1 collects The Incredible Hulk #1–5 and Tales to Astonish #68–84, 752 pages, June 2008,   
The Mighty Thor Omnibus Volume 1 collects Journey Into Mystery #83–89, 93, 97–120 and Journey Into Mystery Annual #1, 768 pages, January 2011, 
The X-Men Omnibus Volume 1 collects X-Men #1–17, 768 pages, April 2009,  
Essential Captain America
 Volume 1 collects Captain America #100–102, 520 pages, March 2000,  
 Volume 2 collects Captain America #103–109, 112 512 pages, January 2002, 
Captain America: Madbomb collects Captain America #193–200, 152 pages, August 2004, 
Captain America: Bicentennial Battles collects Captain America #201–205 and Marvel Treasury Special Featuring Captain America's Bicentennial Battles, 176 pages, June 2005, 
Captain America: The Swine collects Captain America #206–214, Captain America Annual #3 and Captain America Annual #4, 240 pages, December 2006, 
Black Panther
 Volume 1 collects Black Panther #1–7, 136 pages, February 2005, 
 Volume 2 collects Black Panther #8–12, 112 pages, August 2006, 
Eternals Volume 1 collects The Eternals #1–11, 208 pages, June 2008,  
Marvel Visionaries: Jack Kirby:
Volume 1 collects "Mercury in the 20th Century" from Red Raven Comics #1, "The Vision" from Marvel Mystery Comics #13, "Meet Captain America" from Captain America Comics #1, "UFO the Lightning Man" from Yellow Claw #3, "I Defied Pildorr, the Plunderer from Outer Space!" from Strange Tales #94, "I am the Amazing Dr. Droom!" from Amazing Adventures #1, "Beware the Rawhide Kid!" from Rawhide Kid #17, "The Origin of the Hulk" from Hulk #3, "Spidey Tackles the Torch" from Amazing Spider-Man #8, "Captain America Joins the Avengers!" from Avengers #4, "The Fangs of the Fox" from Sgt. Fury #6, "The Coming of Galactus" from Fantastic Four #48–50; "This Man. This Monster" from Fantastic Four #51, "The People Breeders" from Thor #134–135, "To Become an Immortal" from Thor #136, "This is a Plot?" from Fantastic Four Annual #5, "The Inhumans!" from Amazing Adventures vol. 2 #1–2, "America Will Die!" from Captain America #200, "The Fourth Host" from Eternals #7 and "What If the Original Marvel Bullpen Was the Fantastic Four?" from What If? #11, 344 pages, November 2004, 
Volume 2 collects Captain America Comics #1, Marvel Mystery Comics #23, Yellow Claw #4, Strange Tales #89, 114, Two-Gun Kid #60, Love Romances #103, X-Men #9; Tales of Suspense #59, Sgt. Fury #13, Fantastic Four #57–60, Not Brand Echh #1, Thor #154–157, Devil Dinosaur #1, 344 pages, April 2006,

Titan Books
 Best of Simon and Kirby 240 pages, May 2009, 
 The Simon and Kirby Library: Crime 320 pages, November 2011, 
 The Simon and Kirby Library: Horror 320 pages, March 2014, 
 The Simon and Kirby Library: Science Fiction 320 pages, June 2013,  
 The Simon and Kirby Superheroes 480 pages, September 2010,

Posthumous
Work usually based on reworking unused notes and sketches:

Jack Kirby's Galactic Bounty Hunters (pencils, Icon Comics, July 2006–November 2007, collected as, 256 pages, hardcover, October 2007, softcover, July 2008)
 Fantastic Four: The Lost Adventure (with Stan Lee, unused story planned for Fantastic Four #102 some of which was reused in Fantastic Four #108 which is also reprinted, Marvel Comics, April 2008)

Notes

References

Jack Kirby bibliography at Marvel Masterworks.com

External links
 
 Jack Kirby at Mike's Amazing World of Comics

Bibliographies of American writers
Bibliographies by writer
Lists of comics by creator